Art Authority is a producer of fine-art reproductions for art museums and consumers. The company evolved from an art education app developed for MacOS and iOS. The app presents art pieces in a virtual museum interface. A K–12 edition for the iPad displays only age-appropriate images. The app's developers acquired online art seller 1000Museums in 2016 and have since integrated its web site and product line into the app and the company.

Development
The Art Authority app was created and maintained by Open Door Networks and Project A. A partnership with Bridgeman Art Library to enable users to order reproductions of works from the app was announced on May 30, 2012 and implemented as Prints on Demand on September 25, 2012.

The app includes a database of 100,000 works of art, over 1,500 artists and over 1000 museums and other art locations, and is used by apps such as Art Alert and the Art Channel on Apple TV.

The app was upgraded for the retina display concurrently with the release of the 3rd-generation iPad. Exploring Art with Art Authority, an e-book companion to the app, was introduced on April 18, 2012. Access to videos for many of the app's major works was added in December, 2013.

Promotion and use
The iPad version of the app has been used in Seton Hill University art history classes since 2010. Art Authority was one of seven applications shown by senior VP Phil Schiller in Apple's January 19, 2012 education-focused special event at the Solomon R. Guggenheim Museum in New York City.

1000museums.com

In August 2016, Art Authority announced that it had acquired art website 1000museums.com, a website that sells archival reproduction prints and which has partnered with the Louvre, the Guggenheim Museum, and the Van Gogh Museum.

References

Year of introduction missing
Educational software